The Sidelong Glances of a Pigeon Kicker (stylized as Pigeons) is a 1970 American comedy film directed by John Dexter and written by Ron Whyte. The film stars Jordan Christopher, Jill O'Hara, Robert Walden, Kate Reid, William Redfield and Lois Nettleton. The film was released on October 28, 1970, by Metro-Goldwyn-Mayer.

Plot

Three years after graduating from Princeton, disillusioned Jonathan is driving a Manhattan taxicab and expressing his disgust with the world by insulting his obnoxious passengers and kicking pigeons in Riverside Park. His circle of acquaintances includes Winslow Smith, a motorcycle-riding, leather-jacketed, self-styled rebel, whose image is undermined by the fact that at 24 he is still a virgin; Oliver, a homosexual interior decorator who stages elaborate parties and tries, unsuccessfully, to seduce his male guests; and Jennifer, a 21-year-old tenant in Jonathan's building, whose sojourn in New York City to "find herself" is being subsidized by her parents. While attending one of Oliver's wild soirees, Jonathan is accosted by a nymphomaniacal former bedmate, Naomi, who drags him into the bathroom, strips off her clothes, and invites him to join her in the fur-lined tub. Instead, he returns to his apartment, visits Jennifer, and explains why he must maintain emotional detachment. Jennifer, however, is such an understanding listener that she and Jonathan are soon making love. At Christmas, Jonathan takes Jennifer to spend the holidays in Darien, Connecticut, with his suburbanite parents—a possessive and petulant mother and a potentially alcoholic stepfather. But his mother angrily discovers Jonathan and Jennifer nude in the bed, and after a seasonal party leads to further generation gap warfare Jonathan and Jennifer abruptly return to the city. Although drawn to Jennifer, Jonathan is soured by the prospects of married life and is even becoming increasingly apathetic toward his friends. One night, attempting to explain his disenchantment to Jennifer, he enters her apartment and finds her in bed with Winslow. Shattered, Jonathan dazedly drives his cab through the city until finally, in a rage, he plunges off the docks into the river. Recovering in the intensive care unit of a hospital, Jonathan is visited by his friends as well as by Jennifer, who pleads for a second chance to demonstrate her love. Instead Jonathan slips out of the hospital, packs his bags, and boards a train for Des Moines, Iowa. There he plans to drive a truck and continue his isolated existence of thumbing his nose at the world.

Cast 

Jordan Christopher as Jonathan
Jill O'Hara as Jennifer
Robert Walden as Winslow Smith
Kate Reid as Jonathan's Mother
William Redfield as Jonathan's Father
Lois Nettleton as Mildred
Boni Enten as Naomi
Elaine Stritch as Tough Lady
Melba Moore as Model at Party
Riggs O'Hara as Oliver
Kristoffer Tabori as Oliver's Boy Friend
Donald Warfield as Young Stutterer
Jean Shevlin as Mrs. Abelman
Matt Warner as Mr. Abelman
Sylvester Stallone as Party Guest (uncredited)

Release

Home media

The DVD issued by Scorpion Releasing is missing around 15 minutes of footage.

Notes

References

External links 
 
 
 

1970 films
American comedy films
1970 comedy films
Metro-Goldwyn-Mayer films
1970s English-language films
1970s American films